The Canaan–Hereford Road Border Crossing connects the towns of Saint-Herménégilde, Quebec and Canaan, Vermont on the Canada–US border.  The crossing is at the junction of Quebec Route 141 and Vermont Route 141, and is open 24 hours for non-commercial traffic.  Both the US and Canada border inspection stations are among the oldest buildings still being operated by the respective agencies.  The US border station was listed on the National Register of Historic Places in 2014.

Setting
The Canada–United States border between Vermont and Quebec is essentially a straight east–west line. This border crossing is located west of Leach Creek, a tributary of the Connecticut River and northwest of the village center of Canaan.  The Canadian village of Hereford, a small cluster of buildings, is set just north of the border, while the area immediately south of the border is rural.

The crossing is three miles (4.8 km) from the Beecher Falls–East Hereford Border Crossing. A US Border patrol regional headquarters is between the two crossings. Remnants of the old Canaan Line House still stand abandoned between the two countries' border inspection stations.  It once served as a popular watering hole during Prohibition.

Canadian station
The Canadian station is located a short way north of the border, on the east side of Quebec 141.

United States station
It is a -story brick structure with Georgian Revival styling, covered by gabled roof. Single-story four-bay garage wings with hip roof extend to each side, and a metal porte-cochere protects a single lane of traffic during processing. The main block is three bays wide, with display windows flanking a center entrance. The interior is symmetrically arranged, with one side for immigration, and the other for customs. Two of the southern garage bays have been converted into a restroom.

The station was built in 1933, as part of a major program by the United States to improve its land border security.  This program was prompted by increased use of the automobile, a rise in illegal immigration, and of smuggling during Prohibition.  It was one of the first stations built in the state under this program, and follows a plan similar to that of other period stations.  It is one ten surviving 1930s stations in the state.

See also
 List of Canada–United States border crossings
 National Register of Historic Places listings in Essex County, Vermont

References

Canada–United States border crossings
Transportation buildings and structures in Essex County, Vermont
Geography of Estrie
Government buildings on the National Register of Historic Places in Vermont
National Register of Historic Places in Essex County, Vermont
Buildings and structures in Canaan, Vermont
1930 establishments in Quebec
1930 establishments in Vermont